Konrad Emanuel Törnqvist (17 July 1888 – 12 July 1952) was a Swedish footballer who competed at the 1912 Summer Olympics. He was a member of the Swedish Olympic squad in 1912. A defender, he played one match in the consolation tournament.

References

External links
 
 

1888 births
1952 deaths
Association football defenders
Swedish footballers
Sweden international footballers
IFK Göteborg players
Olympic footballers of Sweden
Footballers at the 1912 Summer Olympics